In computability theory a numbering is the assignment of natural numbers to a set of objects such as functions, rational numbers, graphs, or words in some formal language. A numbering can be used to transfer the idea of computability and related concepts, which are originally defined on the natural numbers using computable functions, to these different types of objects.

Common examples of numberings include Gödel numberings in first-order logic, the description numbers that arise from universal Turing machines and admissible numberings of the set of partial computable functions.

Definition and examples 
The value of a numbering ν at a number i (if defined) is often written νi instead of the usual .

Examples of numberings include:
 The set of all finite subsets of  has a numbering  , defined so that  and so that, for each finite nonempty set ,  where  (Ershov 1999:477).  This numbering is a (partial) bijection. 
 A fixed Gödel numbering  of the computable partial functions can be used to define a numbering W of the recursively enumerable sets, by letting by W(i) be the domain of φi.  This numbering will be surjective (like all numberings) but not injective: there will be distinct numbers that map to the same recursively enumerable set under W.

Types of numberings 

A numbering is total if it is a total function. If the domain of a partial numbering is recursively enumerable then there always exists an equivalent total numbering (equivalence of numberings is defined below).

A numbering η is decidable if the set  is a decidable set.

A numbering η is single-valued if η(x) = η(y) if and only if x=y; in other words if η is an injective function. A single-valued numbering of the set of partial computable functions is called a Friedberg numbering.

Comparison of numberings 

There is a preorder on the set of all numberings. Let  and  be two numberings.
if 

Computable numberings 

When the objects of the set S being numbered are sufficiently "constructive", it is common to look at numberings that can be effectively decoded (Ershov 1999:486). For example, if S consists of recursively enumerable sets, the numbering η is computable if the set of pairs (x,y) where y ∈ η(x) is recursively enumerable.  Similarly, a numbering g of partial functions is computable if the relation R(x,y,z) = "[g(x)](y) = z" is partial recursive (Ershov 1999:487).

A computable numbering is called principal if every computable numbering of the same set is reducible to it. A principle numbering of the set of partial recursive functions is known as an admissible numbering in the literature.

See also 
 Complete numbering
 Cylindrification
 Gödel numbering
 Description number

References

 Y.L. Ershov (1999), "Theory of numberings", Handbook of Computability Theory, Elsevier, pp. 473–506.
 V.A. Uspenskiĭ, A.L. Semenov (1993), Algorithms: Main Ideas and Applications, Springer.

Theory of computation
Computability theory